KTM 1190 may refer to:

KTM 1190 Adventure, a roadgoing/off-road (dual-sport) motorcycle introduced in 2013
KTM 1190 RC8, a roadgoing sportbike motorcycle introduced in 2008